The Cabinet of Malawi is the executive branch of the government, made up of the President, Vice President, Ministers and Deputy Ministers responsible for the different departments.

Cabinet as of January 31, 2023 

A new cabinet was appointed on January 31, 2023.

Cabinet as of January 2022
President Lazarus Chakwera's government as of January 2022, has 24 full ministers and 9 deputy ministers. Colleen Zamba is the current Secretary to the President and Cabinet. She replaced Zangazanga chikhosi after her appointment on June 1, 2022 The Secretary to the President and Cabinet is a civil service position which serves as head of the cabinet Secretariat.  The Attorney General also attends cabinet as the chief legal advisor to government. Thabo Chakaka Nyirenda is the attorney general of Malawi.

See also

Malawian past cabinets

References

 
Government of Malawi
Malawi